Sabbatino is an Italian surname, a variation of Sabbatini. Notable people with the surname include: 

Aniello Sabbatino (born 2000), Italian rower
Jules G. Sabbatino (1911–1999), American politician
Sabbatino, C.A.V.'s legal representative in the U.S.

 
Italian-language surnames